Tiaguinho or Thiaguinho is a Portuguese name derived from Tiago or Thiago, meaning little Tiago or Tiago junior, and may refer to:

Thiaguinho (singer) (born 1983), born Thiago André Barbosa, Brazilian singer

Footballers
Thiaguinho (footballer, born 1984), born Thiago Rocha da Cunha, Brazilian defensive midfielder
Thiaguinho (footballer, born 1985), born Thiago Silva de Paiva, Brazilian attacking midfielder
Thiaguinho (footballer, born 1987), born Thiago Benevides Gonçalves, Brazilian winger
Thiaguinho (footballer, born 1989), born Thiago Ribeiro dos Santos, Brazilian wingback
Thiaguinho (footballer, born 1990), born Thiago dos Santos Menezes, Brazilian forward
Thiaguinho (footballer, 1994–2016), born Tiago da Rocha Vieira, Brazilian forward
Tiaguinho (futsal player) (born 1998), born Tiago André Santos Fernandes, Portuguese futsal player
Thiaguinho (footballer, born 1998), born Wytalo Thiago de Assis Lima, Brazilian striker